Events from the year 1972 in South Korea.

Incumbents
President: Park Chung-hee 
Prime Minister: Kim Jong-pil

Events
 December 2 – According to Seoul Fire Department official confirmed report, a massibie caught fire in Seoul Citizen Hall (now Sejong Center), Jongno-gu, Seoul, 51 persons were human fatalities, 76 persons were wounded.

Births
January 1 – Yoon Chan, actor
January 5 – Jang Seo-hee, actress
January 15
 Il Mi Chung, golfer
 Yang Yong-eun, golfer
March 7 – Jang Dong-gun, actor
June 16 – John Cho, actor
July 28 – Yum Jung-ah, actress
August 29 – Bae Yong-joon, actor and businessman
September 6 - Oh Yong-ran, handball player
October 6 – Ko So-young, actress and model
October 8 – Kim Myung-min, actor

See also
List of South Korean films of 1972
Years in Japan
Years in North Korea

References

 
South Korea
Years of the 20th century in South Korea
1970s in South Korea
South Korea